Hope was an unincorporated community, now a neighborhood, located in the former town of Blooming Grove and Cottage Grove in Dane County, Wisconsin, United States. Hope, as of 2020, now lies partially within the city of Madison making it a neighborhood rather than an unincorporated community. Hope does still extend into the unincorporated town of Cottage Grove.

Notes

Unincorporated communities in Wisconsin
Unincorporated communities in Dane County, Wisconsin
Madison, Wisconsin, metropolitan statistical area